Max Eyth (6 May 1836 – 25 August 1906) was a German engineer and writer.

The house where he was born is now a literature museum (2010).

He was born in Kirchheim unter Teck to Edward Eyth (1809–1884), a teacher of Greek and history at an evangelical seminar and his wife Julie. He lived from 1841 to 1852 in Schöntal Abbey where his father was Ephorus at the Evangelical Seminary Maulbronn and Blaubeuren. Besides his profession, his father wrote books about history and literature history. His mother also was an author. 
Young Max spent school time in Heilbronn, and also the first years of his teaching at the Maschinenbau-Gesellschaft Heilbronn Hahn & Göbel.
From 1852 till 1856, he studied at the Polytechnikum Stuttgart Mechanical engineering. Since this time, he was a member of Corps Stauffia Stuttgart. He collected his first experiences at the steam engine factory Gotthilf Kuhn in Berg near Stuttgart. Although his degree, he had to absolve a training as mechanist before he was allowed to make constructors work. Before this, he made technical drawings.
In 1862, he went to steam plow factory John Fowler in Leeds and overtook foreign agency for steam plows. There were many travels and stays in foreign countries, for example in Egypt and the United States. During the time of the American Civil War, he travelled to Egypt. Egypt tried at this time to become the main producer of cotton for Europe.

Max Eyth founded the German Agricultural Society (DLG) in 1885.

References

External links

 
 Homepage Max Eyth
 Text from Max Eyth in Projekt Gutenberg-DE
 Deutsche Landwirtschafts-Gesellschaft (DLG)'s Max-Eyth-Stiftungsprofessur
 Max-Eyth-Gesellschaft Agrartechnik im VDI
 

1906 deaths
1836 births
People from Kirchheim unter Teck
People from the Kingdom of Württemberg
Engineers from Stuttgart
German male writers
Writers from Baden-Württemberg